Density regulated re-initiation and release factor (DENR) is a protein that in humans is encoded by the DENR gene.

Function

This gene encodes a protein whose expression was found to increase in cultured cells at high density but not during growth arrest. This gene was also shown to have increased expression in cells overexpressing the HER2/neu proto-oncogene. The protein contains an SUI1 domain. In budding yeast, SUI1 is a translation initiation factor that along with eIF2 and the initiator Met-tRNAiMet, directs the ribosome to the proper translation start site. Proteins similar to SUI have been found in mammals, insects, and plants. [provided by RefSeq, Jul 2008].

See also
 Eukaryotic initiation factors
 Eukaryotic translation

References

Further reading